Sari Palm is a Finnish politician and a member of the Parliament of Finland between 2007 and 2015 representing Kymi.

Career
Palm was a Member of Parliament between 2007 and 2015. She was a member of the Education and Culture Committee, the Employment and Equality Committee, the Environment Committee and the Advisory Council of the Finnish Institute of International Affairs. Palm has previously been a member of the Grand Committee, the Defence Committee, the Working Subcommittee of the Grand Committee, the Transport and Communications Committee and the Board of the Library of Parliament.

References

1966 births
Living people
People from Valkeala
Christian Democrats (Finland) politicians
Members of the Parliament of Finland (2007–11)
Members of the Parliament of Finland (2011–15)
21st-century Finnish women politicians
Women members of the Parliament of Finland